Bauzi may refer to:

Bauzi people, a people of the Indonesian province of Papua 
Bauzi language, the language of the Bauzi people